21558 Alisonliu, provisional designation , is a stony Eunomia asteroid from the middle region of the asteroid belt, approximately 8 kilometers in diameter. It was discovered on 24 August 1998, by the Lincoln Near-Earth Asteroid Research at the Lincoln Laboratory's Experimental Test Site in Socorro, New Mexico, United States. The asteroid was named for Alison Liu, a 2006 ISEF awardee.

Orbit and classification 

Alisonliu is a member of the Eunomia family, a large group of stony asteroids and the most prominent family in the intermediate main-belt. It orbits the Sun in the central main-belt at a distance of 2.2–3.1 AU once every 4 years and 4 months (1,597 days). Its orbit has an eccentricity of 0.16 and an inclination of 12° with respect to the ecliptic.

Physical characteristics 

Alisonliu has been characterized as a stony S-type asteroid by Pan-STARRS photometric survey.

Lightcurve 

A rotational lightcurve of Alisonliu was obtained from photometric observations made at the Australian Oakley Southern Sky Observatory in April 2010. Lightcurve analysis gave a well-defined rotation period of  hours with a brightness variation of 0.12 magnitude.

Diameter and albedo 

According to the survey carried out by the NEOWISE mission of NASA's space-based Wide-field Infrared Survey Explorer, Alisonliu measures 6.7 and 8.8 kilometers in diameter, and its surface has an albedo of 0.229 and 0.245, respectively, while the Collaborative Asteroid Lightcurve Link assumes an albedo of 0.21 and calculates a diameter of 8.4 kilometers with an absolute magnitude of 12.7.

Naming 

This minor planet was named after Alison Liu (born 1989) who was awarded Intel Best of Category in the 2006 Intel International Science and Engineering Fair (ISEF) for her behavioral and social science team project. In addition, she received the EU Contest for Young Scientists Award. At the time, Liu attended the Manhasset Secondary School in the U.S. state of New York. The approved naming citation was published by the Minor Planet Center on 11 July 2006.

References

External links 
 Asteroid Lightcurve Database (LCDB), query form (info )
 Dictionary of Minor Planet Names, Google books
 Asteroids and comets rotation curves, CdR – Observatoire de Genève, Raoul Behrend
 Discovery Circumstances: Numbered Minor Planets (20001)-(25000) – Minor Planet Center
 
 

021558
021558
Named minor planets
19980824